Gymnastics competitions at the 2019 Pan American Games in Lima, Peru were held between July 27 and August 5, 2019 at the Polideportivo Villa El Salvador, which also hosted the karate competitions.

The artistic competitions took place between July 27 and 31. The rhythmic competition took place between August 2 and 5. The trampoline competition took place between August 4 and 5.

24 medal events were contested; 14 in artistic gymnastics (eight for men, six for women), eight in rhythmic (all for women) and 2 in trampoline (one per gender). A total of 184 ( gymnasts will qualify to compete: 114 in artistic (57 per gender), 46 in rhythmic, and 24 in trampoline (12 per gender).

Medal table

Medalists

Artistic gymnastics

Men's events

Women's events

Rhythmic gymnastics

Individual

Group

Trampoline

Qualification

A total of 184 gymnasts are allowed to compete (114 in artistic, 46 in rhythmic and 24 in trampoline). A nation may enter a maximum of 21 athletes across all disciplines (five in each gender for artistic, five athletes in rhythmic group, two in individual and two in each trampoline event). All qualification was done via the 2018 Pan American Gymnastics Championships.

See also
Gymnastics at the 2020 Summer Olympics

References

External links
Results book – Artistic gymnastics
Results book – Rhythmic gymnastics
Results book – Trampoline gymnastics

 
Events at the 2019 Pan American Games
2019
2019 in artistic gymnastics
2019 in gymnastics
International gymnastics competitions hosted by Peru